Delta Theta Sigma is a social professional agricultural fraternity. It was created in 1906  at The Ohio State University. There are currently seven active chapters of Delta Theta Sigma.

Purpose of Delta Theta Sigma
As stated in its constitution:
We, the members of Delta Theta Sigma Fraternity, in order to promote agriculture, to secure a higher degree of scholarship, to foster the spirit of brotherhood in our vocation, and to ensure social and cultural unity, do promote our organization to the fulfillment of these ideals.

Common Interests

The brotherhood of Delta Theta Sigma is composed of elite agriculture majors from all over the United States. The national Delta Theta Sigma network includes eight chapters through Ohio State University, Pennsylvania State University, University of Wisconsin–Madison, University of Minnesota, University of Wisconsin–River Falls, Purdue University, Wilmington College of Ohio, and University of Minnesota-Crookston. Brothers share common interests in agriculture and outdoor recreation. A majority of the members have agricultural and/or rural backgrounds, which provide common bonds through experiences.

History of Delta Theta Sigma

In the spring of 1906, several men gathered together in a rooming house at 175 West 9th Avenue in Columbus, Ohio. The idea, conceived primarily by three men, Maxwell Corotius, Samuel N. Kerr, and Stanley B. Stowe, was the actual beginning of Delta Theta Sigma Fraternity at The Ohio State University. The fraternity was incorporated under the laws of the State of Ohio on April 5, 1907 with 17 charter members.

The name, Delta Theta Sigma, and the fourfold purposes of the fraternity were drafted with the advice of Professor Smith of the Greek Language Department at Ohio State University.

The Delta Theta Sigma idea was contagious, not only at Ohio State University but also on many other agricultural college campuses throughout the Midwest. Within a few years chapters had been organized on ten other campuses. At a national convention in 1912, all of the chapters except the original chapter at Ohio State University voted to make Delta Theta Sigma an agricultural honorary fraternity. The local chapter at Ohio State University retained the original name, Delta Theta Sigma. The other ten chapters, therefore, assumed the name, Gamma Sigma Delta.

On November 26, 1927, representatives from Delta Theta Sigma at Ohio State University, Alpha Gamma Phi, a local at Pennsylvania State University, and a former FarmHouse chapter at the University of Wisconsin–Madison met in Pittsburgh, Pennsylvania in Room 211 of the William Penn Hotel. This meeting resulted in the formation of a new national agriculture fraternity, Delta Theta Sigma.

Within a two-year period from 1957-1958 all three chapters moved into new houses. Gamma chapter at Wisconsin expanded from one house into two houses located at 320 North Lathrop Street. Beta chapter at Pennsylvania was the victim of a costly fire during the winter of 1958. They were fortunate, however, and found an excellent house at 101 North Patterson Street, into which they moved during the spring of 1958. Alpha chapter at Ohio State outgrew the old house and moved into a new chapter home located at 80 East 13th Avenue in March 1958.

This same year, 1958, found the fraternity growing nationally, also. A fourth chapter, Delta, at the University of Minnesota, was organized and approved for membership in Delta Theta Sigma in May 1958. During the 1960-61 school year, Delta chapter rented their first and present chapter home located at 1485 North Cleveland Ave, St. Paul, MN. Then, in the fall of 1966 growth required they would rent the downstairs of the house next door at 1495 North Cleveland Avenue, in St. Paul.

In 1969, a fifth chapter, Epsilon, was chartered at the University of Wisconsin–River Falls. Albert Beaver, a Gamma chapter alumnus, was instrumental in organizing Epsilon, and in 1970, helped them to purchase the house in which they are presently located.

The Fraternity's sixth chapter, Zeta, was organized and chartered at Purdue University, West Lafayette, Indiana, in the spring of 1982. With the help of four alumni, Neils Neilson, Gamma; George Van Soyoc and Jim Vorst, Alpha; and Herb Olm, Delta, the thirteen charter members and one new member, were activated by National Delta Theta Sigma officers in May 1982. Zeta was very fortunate to be able to rent a house their first year and are presently located at 321 Vine Street.

In January 1983 agricultural students at Wilmington College of Ohio had a desire to belong to a national fraternity. Through the leadership of senior J. Timothy McCarty, thirty-six students were recruited and expressed desire to become founding fathers of Eta chapter. With the direction of National Officer Rick Harr, the Eta chapter was organized and chartered in the Spring of 1983. With the help of the National Executive Council, the purchase of a large house near campus was made, located at 780 Rombach Ave., Wilmington, OH, and was occupied in January 1984.

In 1997 Delta Theta Sigma colonized the University of Minnesota Crookston Chapter with much help from the Men of Delta chapter. Theta chapter was officially recognized as a chapter at the 1998 Conclave hosted by Delta chapter. At its beginning, Theta chapter was renting a house located at 101 North Nelson, Crookston, MN.  They now reside in a house located at 204 Gorgas Ave., in Crookston. .

Notable alumni
Conrad Elvehjem, who discovered niacin, was a member of the University of Wisconsin–Madison chapter.
Harry Steel, who won a gold medal in Freestyle Wrestling for the United States in the 1924 Olympics in Paris, France, was a member of the Ohio State University chapter.
Russell Redding, who is the current Pennsylvania Secretary of Agriculture, was a member of the Pennsylvania State University chapter.
Arthur W. Nesbit, who was the founder and CEO of NASCO, was a member of the Pennsylvania State University chapter.

Chapters
This is the chapter list of Delta Theta Sigma.  Active chapters in bold, inactive chapters in italics.

See also
List of social fraternities and sororities
Professional fraternities and sororities

References

Student organizations established in 1906
Student societies in the United States
Fraternities and sororities in the United States
1906 establishments in Ohio